The Masterdome was located at 137 S. G St. in San Bernardino, California and was a popular concert, sports and rave venue until its destruction.  Originally, it was a trolley barn for the Pacific Electric Railway.  The Masterdome was home to many concerts, sporting events and raves from 1996 to the Summer of 2001. The city of San Bernardino unsuccessfully tried to close the Masterdome.  It was ultimately closed on August 2, 2001, by the San Bernardino fire department recalled the entertainment permits and condemned the venue "Unsafe" due to a collapsing roof. The final event at the Masterdome was Summer Dreams by 26C which took place late in the summer of 2001. The building had already been condemned, thus the entire event took place in the outdoor area.

The venue featured a large indoor boxing arena setting, full sized bleachers on both sides of the dance floor, a large balcony at the front portion of the venue, with a large stage filled with massive concert audio, intelligent lighting, colored scanning lasers and video. The venue was self facilitated with a professional production crew and show management team, led by Matthew Earnest (Event-Ops). Typically outside promoters would manage the promotion and talent, occasionally decorated per event theme, and leave the shows' operation, security and control of the location.

The Masterdome featured three areas for its guests. The outside area had various curbs for people to sit on along the fence area and by the building for people to cool off once the inside of the Masterdome got too hot (See Great Wall Of China). The Venue was previously known as The San Bernardino Sports Arena, also referred to as the G Street Arena. The venue was leased by Ezzat Soliman owner of the Showcase Theatre in Corona, CA - Showcase Theatre in San Diego, CA, CA and formerly of Spanky's Cafe in Riverside, CA.

The Masterdome was one of the constant weekly venues in LA that allowed the Rave scene to thrive, since it allowed underage club goers to attend.  Although So Cal youths had difficulties getting into 21 and over clubs, they could enter Masterdome with ease to all partygoers. Groups such as TYCO, R.O.A.M, E-Tard Ent, Neosapiens and other West Coast promoters would host events with up to 3200 people into this small venue.

A metal concert featuring the bands Napalm Death and Neurosis in early 1999 resulted in the death of 14-year-old Christopher King, of Fontana, CA. The youth had made an attempt to stage dive and crowd surf into an open area, causing the youth to fall on the concrete, severely damaging his spine. A day after the event, the teen died due to lethal nervous system shock.

See also

List of electronic dance music venues

References

Buildings and structures in San Bernardino County, California
Electronic dance music venues